Estelle Skornik (born 4 July 1971 in Paris) is a French actress, known in the United Kingdom for playing "Nicole" alongside Max Douchin ("Papa") in a range of Renault Clio advertisements.

Family
Her ancestors were Polish Jews, and her grandfather was killed trying to escape from Auschwitz.<ref>Jewish Chronicle, 4 April 1997, page 38</ref>

Career
Her theatre debut was with the Francis Huster Company, at the same times as the actresses Valérie Crunchant, Christiana Reali, Clotilde Courau and Valentine Varela. She has subsequently devoted her career more to cinema and notably appeared in Prise au piège (director: Jérôme Enrico) with Lucia Sanchez and Nils Tavernier.

In the United Kingdom she is most notable for playing "Nicole" alongside Max Douchin ("Papa") in a range of Renault Clio advertisements; the last was in May 1998 and featured the comedians Vic Reeves and Bob Mortimer. It has been said that she was unable to drive when the advertisements were made.  However, she has stated this was untrue. 

She also played in the theatre, in the production Home Truths at the Devonshire Park Theatre, Eastbourne, United Kingdom, between 19 and 24 May 1997.

 Television 
 1991–1998: Papa & Nicole (Renault Clio adverts)
 1993 : Les Maîtres du pain (dir: Hervé Baslé)
 1995 : Porté disparu (dir: Jacques Richard)
 1999 : Prise au piège (dir: Jérôme Enrico)
 1999 : Hornblower (dir: Andrew Grieve) as Mariette
 1997 : Le Baiser sous la cloche (dir: Emmanuel Gust)
 2004 : “Maigret and the Shadow Puppet (L’Ombre Chinoise) as Nine Moinard
 2009 : Le Chasseur (dir: Nicolas Cuche)
 2009 : Ce jour-là tout a changé (dir: Arnaud Sélignac) as Queen Marie-Antoinette
 2009 : R.I.S, police scientifique Film 
 1992 : Albert souffre (dir: Bruno Nuytten )
 1993 : La Mal Aimée (dir: Bertrand Arthuys)
 1997 : Marquise (dir: Véra Belmont) as Marie
 1999 : Les Parasites, (dir: Philippe de Chauveron)
 2000 : Virilité et autres sentiments modernes (dir: Ronan Girre)
 2001 : L'Amour absent (dir: Christian Louis-Vital)
 2001 : From Hell (dir: Albert Hughes) as Ada
 2011 : Les Lyonnais (dir: Olivier Marchal)

 Theatre 
 1995 : Le Misanthrope'' by Molière, directed by Francis Huster

References

External links 

1971 births
Living people
French stage actresses
French film actresses
French television actresses
Actresses from Paris
French people of Polish-Jewish descent
20th-century French actresses
21st-century French actresses